Kathy Swanson is an American politician who served as a member of the Montana House of Representatives from 2011 to 2019. She was elected to House District 86 which represents the Granite County area.

References

Living people
Year of birth missing (living people)
Democratic Party members of the Montana House of Representatives